William Linton may refer to:

William C. Linton, founder and editor of the Chicago Whip newspaper
William S. Linton (1856–1927), U.S. politician from Michigan
William James Linton (1812–1897), Anglo-American author, artist and political reformer
William Linton (artist) (1791–1876), British landscapist
William Richardson Linton (1850–1908), British botanist
William Alderman Linton (1891–1960), Presbyterian missionary and educator in Korea
William Linton (songwriter), writer of the #1 hit song "Easier Said Than Done"

See also
Linton (name)